Patrick Weathers is an American musician, actor and comedian, who appeared as a cast member on season 6 of Saturday Night Live from 1980–1981.

Among the recurring characters Weathers played was Ronald Reagan  His musical ability was called upon in a skit where he played Bob Dylan, opposite guest host David Carradine, reprising his portrayal of Woody Guthrie.  He also played Ravi Shankar, the musician who introduced The Beatles  to Indian music.

Weathers had a successful musical career, prior to his year on SNL, and returned to music afterwards, releasing three albums, and settling in New Orleans.  He owns several art galleries there.

References

External links

Living people
Male actors from Mississippi
American sketch comedians
American male television actors
Year of birth missing (living people)